Lithuania participated in the Eurovision Song Contest 2017 with the song "Rain of Revolution" written by Viktorija Ivanovskaja, Denis Zujev and Michail Levin. The song was performed by the band Fusedmarc. The Lithuanian broadcaster Lithuanian National Radio and Television (LRT) organised the national final "Eurovizijos" dainų konkurso nacionalinė atranka (Eurovision Song Contest national selection) in order to select the Lithuanian entry for the 2017 contest in Kyiv, Ukraine. The national final took place over 10 weeks and involved 49 competing entries. The results of each show were determined by the combination of votes from a jury panel and a public vote. In the final, seven artists and songs remained and "Rain of Revolution" performed by Fusedmarc was selected as the winner.

Lithuania was drawn to compete in the second semi-final of the Eurovision Song Contest which took place on 11 May 2017. Performing during the show in position 16, "Rain of Revolution" was not announced among the top 10 entries of the second semi-final and therefore did not qualify to compete in the final. It was later revealed that Lithuania placed seventeenth out of the 18 participating countries in the semi-final with 42 points.

Background 

Prior to the 2017 contest, Lithuania had participated in the Eurovision Song Contest seventeen times since its first entry in 1994. The nation's best placing in the contest was sixth, which it achieved in 2006 with the song "We Are the Winners" performed by LT United. In the 2016 contest, "I've Been Waiting for This Night" performed by Donny Montell qualified to the final where the song scored 200 points and placed 9th.
 
For the 2017 Contest, Lithuanian national broadcaster LRT broadcast the event within the nation and organised the selection process for  its entry. Other than the internal selection of their debut entry in 1994, Lithuania has selected their entry consistently through a national final procedure. LRT confirmed their intentions to participate at the 2017 Eurovision Song Contest on 11 August 2016 and announced the organization of "Eurovizijos" dainų konkurso nacionalinė atranka, which would be the national final to select Lithuania's entry for Kyiv.

Before Eurovision

"Eurovizijos" dainų konkurso nacionalinė atranka
"Eurovizijos" dainų konkurso nacionalinė atranka (Eurovision Song Contest national selection) was the national final format developed by LRT in order to select Lithuania's entry for the Eurovision Song Contest 2017. The competition involved a ten-week-long process that commenced on 7 January 2017 and concluded with a winning song and artist on 11 March 2017. The 10 shows were hosted by Ieva Stasiulevičiūtė and Gabrielė Martirosianaitė and were broadcast on LRT televizija, LRT Lituanica and LRT Radijas as well as online via the broadcaster's website lrt.lt.

Format 
The 2017 competition involved 49 entries and consisted of 10 shows. The first four shows consisted of 11 to 13 entries each and resulted in the elimination of 25 entries all together. The remaining 24 entries participated in the fifth and sixth shows where each show consisted of 12 entries and the bottom four were eliminated. The remaining 16 entries participated in the seventh and eighth show where each show consisted of eight entries and the top four advanced to the competition's semi-final. In the semi-final, two entries were eliminated and the top six proceeded to the final, while a public online repechage vote selected an additional entry for the final among six of the previously eliminated acts. In the final, the winner was selected from the remaining seven entries.

The results of each of the 10 shows were determined by the 50/50 combination of votes from a jury panel and public televoting. The ranking developed by both streams of voting was converted to points from 1-8, 10 and 12 and assigned based on the number of competing songs in the respective show. During the first six shows, the jury votes were determined by a four-member Lithuanian panel only. From the seventh to ninth shows, the jury votes consisted of a combination of a Lithuanian jury panel consisting of four members and an international jury panel consisting of three members. In the final, a seven-member Lithuanian panel and a four-member international panel voted. The public could vote through telephone and SMS voting. Ties in all shows but the final were decided in favour of the entry that received the most votes from the public. In the final, a tie was decided in favour of the entry that was awarded the most points by the jury.

Competing entries
On 12 October 2016, LRT opened two separate submission forms: one for artists and another for songwriters to submit their songs. Artists that applied to compete with a song were required to indicate which song they wanted to compete with on their application. The submission deadline for both applications concluded on 1 December 2016. On 28 December 2016, LRT announced the 51 artists selected for the competition during a press conference. Among the artists were previous Lithuanian Eurovision contestants Sasha Song, who represented Lithuania in 2009, and Vilija Matačiūnaitė, who represented the nation in 2014. On 26 January 2017, the final changes to the list of 51 competing acts were made with the withdrawal of singers Soliaris and Ruslanas Kirilkinas.

Shows

Elimination shows 
The eight elimination shows of the competition aired from the LRT studios in Vilnius between 7 January and 25 February 2017. The first four shows featured the 39 competing entries, while the fifth and sixth show each featured 12 of the 24 remaining entries in the competition, and the seventh to eighth show each featured eight of the 16 remaining entries in the competition. The members of the Lithuanian jury consisted of Ramūnas Zilnys (music reviewer; all shows), Darius Užkuraitis (LRT Opus director; all shows), Sigutė Stonytė (singer; first and third show), Neda Malūnavičiūtė (singer; first show), Justė Arlauskaitė (singer; second and third show), Kazimieras Šiaulys (music critic and journalist; second show), Gintaras Rinkevičius (director; fourth and fifth show), Povilas Meškėla (lead singer of the group Rojaus tūzai; fourth and sixth show), Nomeda Kazlaus (opera singer; fifth, seventh and eighth shows), Vytautas Lukočius (conductor; sixth show), Gediminas Zujus (producer; seventh show) and Dalia Ibelhauptaitė (director and playwright; eighth show). International jury members included Will Wells (American producer and musician, touring member of Imagine Dragons; seventh and eighth show), Denis Ingoldsby (British producer; seventh and eighth show), Sean-Poul de Fré Gress (Danish rapper; seventh show) and Sasha Jean Baptiste (Swedish staging director; eight show). The top six entries advanced in the first four shows, while the top eight entries advanced in the fifth and sixth show, and the top four entries advanced in the seventh and eighth show. The bottom entries were eliminated in each show.

Semi-final 
The semi-final of the competition aired from the LRT studios in Vilnius on 4 March 2017 and featured the remaining eight entries that qualified from the eighth show. The show was filmed on 28 February 2017. The members of the Lithuanian jury consisted of Ramūnas Zilnys (music reviewer), Dalia Ibelhauptaitė (director and playwright), Povilas Meškėla (singer) and Darius Užkuraitis (LRT Opus director). International jury members included Will Wells (American producer and musician, touring member of Imagine Dragons), Denis Ingoldsby (British producer) and Sasha Jean Baptiste (Swedish staging director). The top six entries advanced to the final, while the bottom two were eliminated.

Online repechage 
The entries placed fifth and sixth in the seventh and eighth elimination shows as well as the bottom two entries of the semi-final were voted upon by the public through LRT's internet voting platform on 6 March 2017. "Get Frighten" performed by Gytis Ivanauskas advanced to the final after receiving the most votes.

Final 
The final of the competition took place on 11 March 2017 at the Švyturys Arena in Klaipėda and featured the remaining seven entries that qualified from the semi-final and the online repechage. The final was the only show in the competition to be broadcast live; all other preceding shows were pre-recorded earlier in the week before their airdates. Jury voting in the final was decided by a seven-member Lithuanian panel and a four-member international panel. The members of the Lithuanian panel consist of Ramūnas Zilnys (music reviewer), Dalia Ibelhauptaitė (director and playwright), Vytautas Lukočius (conductor), Nomeda Kazlaus (opera singer), Kazimieras Šiaulys (music critic and journalist), Povilas Meškėla (lead singer of the group Rojaus tūzai) and Donny Montell (singer-songwriter). The international panel consisted of Peter Freudenthaler (lead singer of the German group Fools Garden), Denis Ingoldsby (British producer), Lauris Reiniks (Latvian singer-songwriter) and Chloe Maggs (Australian lead vocalist for the American group The Pussycat Dolls). "Rain of Revolution" performed by Fusedmarc was selected as the winner after gaining the most points from both the jury vote and the public vote. In addition to the performances of the competing entries, Donny Montell opened the show with the song "Screw Me Up" and the 2016 Lithuanian Eurovision entry "I've Been Waiting for This Night", and SunStroke Project performed the 2017 Moldovan Eurovision entry "Hey, Mamma!" as the interval act.

Promotion 
Fusedmarc made several appearances across Europe to specifically promote "Rain of Revolution" as the Lithuanian Eurovision entry. Between 3 and 6 April, Fusedmarc took part in promotional activities in Tel Aviv, Israel where she performed during the Israel Calling event held at the Ha'teatron venue. On 8 April, Fusedmarc performed during the Eurovision in Concert event which was held at the Melkweg venue in Amsterdam, Netherlands and hosted by Cornald Maas and Selma Björnsdóttir. On 15 April, Fusedmarc performed during the Eurovision Spain Pre-Party, which was held at the Sala La Riviera venue in Madrid, Spain.

At Eurovision 

According to Eurovision rules, all nations with the exceptions of the host country and the "Big Five" (France, Germany, Italy, Spain and the United Kingdom) are required to qualify from one of two semi-finals in order to compete for the final; the top ten countries from each semi-final progress to the final. The European Broadcasting Union (EBU) split up the competing countries into six different pots based on voting patterns from previous contests, with countries with favourable voting histories put into the same pot. On 31 January 2017, an allocation draw was held which placed each country into one of the two semi-finals, as well as which half of the show they would perform in. Lithuania was placed into the second semi-final, held on 11 May 2017, and was scheduled to perform in the second half of the show.

Once all the competing songs for the 2017 contest had been released, the running order for the semi-finals was decided by the shows' producers rather than through another draw, so that similar songs were not placed next to each other. Lithuania was set to perform in position 16, following the entry from Bulgaria and before the entry from Estonia.

The two semi-finals and final were broadcast in Lithuania on LRT, LRT HD and LRT Radijas with commentary by Darius Užkuraitis and Gerūta Griniūtė. The Lithuanian spokesperson, who announced the top 12-point score awarded by the Lithuanian jury during the final, was Eglė Daugėlaitė.

Semi-final 

Fusedmarc took part in technical rehearsals on 2 and 5 May, followed by dress rehearsals on 10 and 11 May. This included the jury show on 10 May where the professional juries of each country watched and voted on the competing entries.

The Lithuanian performance featured the members of Fusedmarc performing on stage with red stage colours and the LED screens and floor displaying a heartbeat during the first chorus and a ring of fire towards the end. Lead singer Viktorija Ivanovskaja wore a red dress while Denis Zujev was dressed in black. The performance also featured a camera shot from above the stage to display the ring of fire on the LED screens and floor. Fusedmarc was joined by four backing vocalists on stage: Jekaterina Fiodorova, Kristina Žaldokaitė, Laura Rakauskaitė and Vaiva Adomaitytė.

At the end of the show, Lithuania was not announced among the top 10 entries in the second semi-final and therefore failed to qualify to compete in the final. It was later revealed that Lithuania placed seventeenth in the semi-final, receiving a total of 42 points: 25 points from the televoting and 17 points from the juries.

Voting
Voting during the three shows involved each country awarding two sets of points from 1-8, 10 and 12: one from their professional jury and the other from televoting. Each nation's jury consisted of five music industry professionals who are citizens of the country they represent, with their names published before the contest to ensure transparency. This jury judged each entry based on: vocal capacity; the stage performance; the song's composition and originality; and the overall impression by the act. In addition, no member of a national jury was permitted to be related in any way to any of the competing acts in such a way that they cannot vote impartially and independently. The individual rankings of each jury member as well as the nation's televoting results were released shortly after the grand final.

Below is a breakdown of points awarded to Lithuania and awarded by Lithuania in the second semi-final and grand final of the contest, and the breakdown of the jury voting and televoting conducted during the two shows:

Points awarded to Lithuania

Points awarded by Lithuania

Detailed voting results
The following members comprised the Lithuanian jury:
 Vytenis Pauliukaitis (jury chairperson)television and entertainment director
 Giedrė Kilčiauskienėsinger
 Viktorija Navickaitėjournalist
 singer
 Vaidas Stackevičiusmusic producer

References

External links 

2017
Countries in the Eurovision Song Contest 2017
Eurovision